The 1971 All England Championships was a badminton tournament held at Wembley Arena, London, England, from 24–28 March 1971.

Final results

The defending women's champion Etsuko Takenaka withdrew with an injured knee. 
Judy Hashman represented England instead of the United States and Gillian Perrin married meaning her name would now be Gillian Gilks.
Irmgard Latz married and became Imgard Gerlatzka and Pernille Molgaard-Hansen married and became Pernille Kaagaard.

Men's singles

Section 1

Section 2

+ Denotes seed

Women's singles

Section 1

Section 2

References

All England Open Badminton Championships
All England
All England Open Badminton Championships in London
All England Badminton Championships
All England Badminton Championships
All England Badminton Championships